The Waco CG-4 was the most widely used American troop/cargo military glider of World War II. It was designated the CG-4A by the United States Army Air Forces, and given the service name Hadrian (after the Roman emperor) by the British.

The glider was designed by the Waco Aircraft Company. Flight testing began in May 1942. More than 13,900 CG-4As were eventually delivered.

Design and development
The CG-4A was constructed of fabric-covered wood and metal and was crewed by a pilot and copilot. It had two fixed mainwheels and a tailwheel.

The CG-4A could carry 13 troops and their equipment. Cargo loads could be a     -ton truck (i.e. a Jeep), a 75 mm howitzer, or a -ton trailer, loaded through the upward-hinged nose section. Douglas C-47 Skytrains were usually used as tow aircraft. A few Curtiss C-46 Commando tugs were used during and after the Operation Plunder crossing of the Rhine in March 1945.

The USAAF CG-4A tow line was  nylon, 350 feet (107 m) long. The CG-4A pickup line was  inch (24 mm) diameter nylon, but only 225 ft (69 m) long including the doubled loop.

In an effort to identify areas where strategic materials could be reduced, a single XCG-4B was built at the Timm Aircraft Corporation using wood for the main structure.

Production
From 1942 to 1945, the Ford Motor Company's plant in Kingsford, Michigan, built 4,190 Model CG-4A gliders for use in combat operations during World War II. The Kingsford plant built more CG-4A gliders than any other company in the nation at much less cost than other manufacturers. The other primary builders of the Model CG-4A gliders were located in Troy, Ohio; Greenville, Michigan; Astoria, New York; Kansas City, Missouri and St. Paul, Minnesota.

The 16 companies that were prime contractors for manufacturing the CG-4A were:
Babcock Aircraft Company of DeLand, Florida (60 at $51,000 each) 
Cessna Aircraft Company of Wichita, Kansas (750) The entire order was subcontracted to Boeing Aircraft Company's new Wichita plant.
Commonwealth Aircraft of Kansas City (1,470)
Ford Motor Company of Kingsford, Michigan (4,190 units at $14,891 each)
G&A Aircraft of Willow Grove, PA (627)
General Aircraft Corporation of Astoria, L.I.,NY (1,112)
Gibson Refrigerator of Greenville, Michigan (1,078)
Laister-Kauffman Corporation of St. Louis, Missouri (310)
National Aircraft Corp. of Elwood, IN (one, at an astronomical $1,741,809)
Northwestern Aeronautical Corporation of Minneapolis (1,510)
Pratt-Read of Deep River, Connecticut (956)
Ridgefield Manufacturing Company of Ridgeville, New Jersey (156)
Robertson Aircraft Corporation of St. Louis (170)
Timm Aircraft Company of Van Nuys, California (434)
Waco Aircraft Company of Troy (1074 [999] units at $19,367 each)
Ward Furniture Company of Fort Smith, Arkansas (7)

The factories ran 24-hour shifts to build the gliders. One night-shift worker in the Wicks Aircraft Company factory in Kansas City wrote,

Operational history

Sedalia Glider Base was originally activated on 6 August 1942. In November 1942 the installation became Sedalia Army Air Field, (after the war would be renamed Whiteman Air Force Base) and was assigned to the 12th Troop Carrier Command of the United States Army Air Forces. The field served as a training site for glider pilots and paratroopers. Assigned aircraft included the CG-4A glider, Curtiss C-46 Commando, and Douglas C-47 Skytrain. The C-46 was not used as a glider tug in combat, however, until Operation Plunder (the crossing of the Rhine) in March 1945.

CG-4As went into operation in July 1943 during the Allied invasion of Sicily. They were flown 450 miles across the Mediterranean from North Africa for the night-time assaults such as Operation Ladbroke. Inexperience and poor conditions contributed to the heavy losses. They participated in the American airborne landings in Normandy on 6 June 1944, and in other important airborne operations in Europe and in the China Burma India Theater. Although not the intention of the Army Air Forces, gliders were generally considered expendable by high-ranking European theater officers and combat personnel and were abandoned or destroyed after landing. While equipment and methods for extracting flyable gliders were developed and delivered to Europe, half of that equipment was rendered unavailable by certain higher-ranked officers. Despite this lack of support for the recovery system, several gliders were recovered from Normandy and even more from Operation Market Garden in the Netherlands and Wesel, Germany.

The CG-4A found favor where its small size was a benefit. The larger British Airspeed Horsa could carry more troopers (seating for 28 or a jeep or an anti-tank gun), and the British General Aircraft Hamilcar could carry 7 tons (enough for a light tank), but the CG-4A could land in smaller spaces. In addition, by using a fairly simple grapple system, an in-flight C-47 equipped with a tail hook and rope braking drum could "pick up" a CG-4A waiting on the ground. The system was used in the 1945 high-elevation rescue of the survivors of the Gremlin Special 1945 crash, in a mountain valley of New Guinea.

The CG-4A was also used to send supplies to partisans in Yugoslavia.

After World War II ended, most of the remaining CG-4As were declared surplus and almost all were sold. Many were bought for the wood in the large shipping boxes. Others were bought for conversion to towed camping homes with the wing and tail end cut off and being towed by the rear section and others sold for hunting cabins and lake side vacation cabins.

The last known use of the CG-4A was in the early 1950s by the USAF with an Arctic detachment aiding scientific research. The CG-4As were used for getting personnel down to, and up from, floating ice floes, with the glider being towed out, released for landing, and then picked up later by the same type of aircraft, using the hook and line method developed during World War II. The only modification to the CG-4A was the fitting of wide skis in place of the landing gear for landing on the Arctic ice floes.

Variants

XCG-4 Prototypes, two built, plus one stress test article
CG-4A Main Production variant, survivors became G-4A in 1948, 13,903 built by 16 contractors
XCG-4B One Timm-built CG-4A with a plywood structure
XPG-1 One CG-4A converted with two Franklin 6AC-298-N3 engines by Northwestern
XPG-2 One CG-4A converted with two  Ranger L-440-1 engines by Ridgefield
XPG-2A Two articles: XPG-2 engines changed to  plus one CG-4A converted also with  engines
PG-2A Production PG-2A with two  L-440-7s, redesignated G-2A in 1948, 10 built by Northwestern
XPG-2B Cancelled variant with two R-775-9 engines
LRW-1 CG-4A transferred to the United States Navy (13 units)
G-2A PG-2A re-designated in 1948
G-4A CG-4A re-designated in 1948
G-4C G-4A with different tow-bar, 35 conversions
Hadrian Mk.I Royal Air Force designation for the CG-4A, 25 delivered
Hadrian Mk.II Royal Air Force designation for the CG-4A with equipment changes

Operators

Royal Canadian Air Force

Czechoslovakian Air Force operated 2 or 3 Wacos, designated NK-4

Army Air Corps
Glider Pilot Regiment
Royal Air Force
No. 668 Squadron RAF
No. 669 Squadron RAF
No. 670 Squadron RAF
No. 671 Squadron RAF
No. 672 Squadron RAF
No. 673 Squadron RAF

United States Army Air Forces
United States Navy

Accidents and incidents
1 August 1943: CG-4A-RO 42-78839, built by contractor Robertson Aircraft Corporation, lost its right wing and plummeted to earth immediately after release by a tow airplane over Lambert Field, St. Louis, Missouri, USA. Several thousand spectators had gathered for the first public demonstration of the St. Louis-built glider, which was flown by 2 USAAF crewmen and carried St. Louis mayor William D. Becker, Robertson Aircraft co-founder Maj. William B. Robertson, and 6 other VIP passengers; all 10 occupants perished in the crash. The accident was attributed to the failure of a defective wing strut fitting that had been provided by a subcontractor; the post-crash investigation indicted Robertson Aircraft for lax quality control; several inspectors were relieved of duty.

Surviving aircraft

 42-43809 – On display at the Museum of Army Flying in Middle Wallop, Hampshire.
 45-13696 – CG-4A under restoration at the Yanks Air Museum in Chino, California.
 45-14647 – Cockpit section on static display at the Pima Air & Space Museum in Tucson, Arizona.
 45-15009 – CG-4A on static display at the Air Mobility Command Museum at Dover Air Force Base near Dover, Delaware.
 45-15574 – On static display at the Cradle of Aviation Museum in Garden City, New York.
 45-15691 – On display at the Silent Wings Museum in Lubbock, Texas.
 45-15965 – On display at the Kalamazoo Air Zoo in Portage, Michigan. It is painted as 42–46574.
 45-17241 – On static display at the Airborne Museum in Sainte-Mère-Église, Normandy.
 45-27948 – CG-4A on static display at the National Museum of the United States Air Force in Dayton, Ohio.
 Replica – On display at the Fagen Fighters World War II Museum in Granite Falls, Minnesota.
 Replica – On display at The Fighting Falcon Museum in Greenville, Michigan.
 Unknown – On display at the Menominee Range Historical Foundation in Iron Mountain, Michigan.
 Unknown – CG-4A on display at the National Soaring Museum in Elmira, New York.
 Unknown – Cockpit section on display at the Travis Air Force Base Heritage Center in Fairfield, California.
 CG-4A on display at the Silent Wings Museum in Lubbock, Texas.
 Unknown – CG-4A on display at the Don F. Pratt Memorial Museum at Fort Campbell near Clarksville, Tennessee.
 Unknown – CG-4A on static display at the Yorkshire Air Museum in Elvington, Yorkshire.
 Unknown – On display at the Assault Glider Trust in Shawbury, Shropshire.
 Unknown – On static display at the Airborne & Special Operations Museum in Fayetteville, North Carolina.
 Unknown – On static display during restoration at the U.S. Veterans Memorial Museum in Huntsville, Alabama.
 Replica - A CG-4 'Hadrian' nose section is on display at the South Yorkshire Aircraft Museum, Doncaster, United Kingdom. The replica was produced for the film Saving Private Ryan.

Specifications (CG-4A)

See also

References

Notes

Citations

Bibliography

 AAF Manual No. 50-17, Pilot Training Manual for the CG-4A Glider. US Government, 1945, select pages available on Wikimedia Commons, Category:Waco CG-4.
 AAF TO NO. 09-40CA-1, Pilot's Flight Operating Instructions for Army Model CG-4A Glider, British Model Hadrian.US Government, 1944, available on Wikimedia Commons, Category:Waco CG-4.
 Andrade, John M. U.S. Military Aircraft Designations and Serials since 1909. Earl Shilton, Leister, UK: Midland Counties Publications, 1979. .
 Diehl, Alan E., PhD. Silent Knights: Blowing the Whistle on Military Accidents and Their Cover-ups. Dulles, Virginia: Brassey's, Inc., 2002. .
 Fitzsimons, Bernard, ed. "Waco CG-4A." Illustrated Encyclopedia of 20th Century Weapons and Warfare, Volume 11. London: Phoebus, 1978. .
 Gero, David B. Military Aviation Disasters: Significant Losses Since 1908. Sparkford, Yoevil, Somerset, UK: Haynes Publishing, 2010, .
 Masters, Charles J., Glidermen of Neptune: The American D-Day Glider Attack Carbondale, Illinois: Southern Illinois University Press, 1995. .

External links

3D-model of Waco CG-4
"Silent Partner of the Plane." Popular Science, February 1944, pp. 94-101. First large article on CG-4A published during World War II; rare photos and drawings
"Glider Parade" Popular Mechanics,August 1944, pp. 14–15.
So We Bought a Glider – Flying
The Assault Glider Trust
Silent Wings Museum
U.S. Army Airborne and Special Operations Museum, World War II CG-4A Glider Exhibit, Fort Bragg NC
Detailed photos of the CG-4A in the National Soaring Museum
More detailed photos of the CG-4A in the National Soaring Museum, including manual pages
National WWII Glider Pilots Association, Inc.

Waco G-04
Waco CG-04
World War II aircraft of the United States
CG-4
High-wing aircraft
Aircraft first flown in 1942
Military gliders